Princess Ludovika of Bavaria (Marie Ludovika Wilhelmine; Mary Louise Wilhelmina; 30 August 1808 – 25 January 1892) was the sixth child of King Maximilian I Joseph of Bavaria and his second wife, Karoline of Baden, and the mother of Empress Elisabeth of Austria. She was born and died in Munich.

Life

Early years
Marie Ludovika Wilhelmine was born to King Maximilian I Joseph of Bavaria and his second wife Caroline of Baden as their fifth child, The birth of Ludovika was known to be difficult. Ludovika was christened one day after her birth as Ludovika Wilhelmine. 

Ludovika and her sisters received many lessons in literature as well as geography and history. They both spoke German and French.

Marriage
Ludovika married Maximilian Joseph, Duke in Bavaria, whose father Duke Pius August in Bavaria was her cousin, on 9 September 1828 in Tegernsee. Ludovika was always frustrated that, unlike her elder sisters who married kings and Austrian archdukes, she would not be marrying someone with a grand title, but rather a peculiar and childish duke who had a fondness for circuses. However, Ludovika was determined to create dynastic marriages for her daughters. She and her husband had ten children, including Empress Elisabeth of Austria and Queen Maria Sofia of the Two Sicilies.

Maximilian was mostly away from home; due to this, Ludovika wrote that she spent their first wedding anniversary alone and wept. Though, in 1830, Ludovika found herself pregnant with their first child. She gave birth 21 June 1831 to a son who they named Ludwig Wilhelm.

Children

Ancestry

References and notes

External links
 

1808 births
1892 deaths
Bavarian princesses
Duchesses of Bavaria
House of Wittelsbach
Nobility from Munich
19th-century German people
19th-century German women
Daughters of kings